Bezirk Mödling is a district of the state of Lower Austria in Austria.

Municipalities
Suburbs, hamlets and other subdivisions of a municipality are indicated in small characters.
 Achau
 Biedermannsdorf
 Breitenfurt bei Wien
 Brunn am Gebirge
 Gaaden
 Gießhübl
 Gumpoldskirchen
 Guntramsdorf
 Hennersdorf bei Wien
 Hinterbrühl
 Hinterbrühl, Sparbach, Weissenbach bei Mödling, Wassergspreng
 Kaltenleutgeben
 Laab im Walde
 Laxenburg
 Maria Enzersdorf
 Mödling
 Münchendorf
 Perchtoldsdorf
 Vösendorf
 Wiener Neudorf
 Wienerwald
 Dornbach, Grub, Gruberau, Sittendorf, Stangau, Sulz im Wienerwald, Wöglerin

 
Districts of Lower Austria